The Almighty Latin King and Queen Nation (ALKQN, ALKN, or LKN, also known as simply Latin Kings) is one of the largest Hispanic and Latino street and prison gangs worldwide. The gang was founded by Puerto Ricans in Chicago, Illinois in 1954.

History

King Motherland Chicago faction
The Latin Kings were founded in the Humboldt Park area of Chicago in 1954 by Ramon Santos as the Imperials, a Puerto Rican progress movement with the goal of overcoming racial discrimination. With the Latino community facing constant violence from Greek and Italian greaser gangs, the Imperials merged with various other Puerto Rican and Mexican street gangs to form the Latin Kings. They would later, however, devolve into a criminal enterprise operating throughout the United States. There are two umbrella factions: the King Motherland Chicago (KMC) – also known as King Manifesto and Constitution – and Bloodline, formed in New York City in 1986. All members of the gang identify themselves as Latin Kings.

Latin Kings associating with the Motherland faction also identify themselves as "Almighty Latin King Nation" (ALKN); they make up more than 160 structured chapters operating in 158 cities in 31 states. The membership in Chicago is estimated to be 20,000 to 35,000.

The Chicago faction of the Latin Kings is recognized as one of the largest Hispanic street gangs in the United States after the Sureños and Norteños, as well as MS-13 and the 18th Street gang, and one of the largest street gangs based in Chicago. Their greatest membership is within the United States; in the city of Chicago alone, the gang has more than 25,000 members. The Latin Kings have also organized chapters in numerous states and several Latin American and European countries.

Bloodline faction
The Bloodline Manifesto was founded by Luis "King Blood" Felipe in 1986 in the New York State Collins Correctional Facility. Latin Kings associating with New York State Bloodline chapter also identify themselves as the "Almighty Latin King and Queen Nation" (ALKQN). Membership is estimated to be as large as 7,500, divided among several dozen tribes operating in 15 cities across five states. New York State Bloodline Latin Kings share a common culture and structure with KMC and respect them as the Motherland, but not all chapters report to the Chicago leadership hierarchy.

In the early 1980s, to avoid imprisonment for his criminal activities in Chicago, Luis Felipe (a.k.a. King Blood) fled to New York. Soon after arriving in New York, Felipe was arrested and convicted of murdering his girlfriend. In 1986, while in prison, Felipe started his own chapter of the Latin Kings known as the Bloodline. He designated himself as Inca and Supreme Crown of the state of New York. From 1986 to 1994, the ALKQN solidified its status as a gang through crimes such as murder, racketeering, and other offenses covered under the RICO Act. In 1991, Felipe was returned to prison after a short release for parole violations stemming from the receipt of stolen goods. However, Felipe continued to guide the ALKQN members, who now numbered about 2,000, both incarcerated and free. In 1994, with the rapid growth of the Latin Kings, an internal power struggle erupted, and violence within the Kings ensued. Between June 1993 and February 1994, seven Latin Kings were murdered. Following the outbreak of internal gang violence, Luis Felipe and 19 others were charged with murder and racketeering; the indictment process ended in 1995 with 39 Latin Kings and 1 Latin Queen indicted under the RICO Act. Felipe was charged with ordering the killing of William (Lil Man) Cartagena, who had been taken to an abandoned Bronx apartment and strangled, decapitated, mutilated and set on fire. Although Felipe was in prison, the government later alleged he had ordered a T.O.S. ("Terminate On Sight") to all Latin Kings for the murder of Cartagena. This letter and many others were how Felipe was initially linked to three murders on the streets of New York; testimony from former Kings was used as further evidence of the orders. The letters had been copied and stored by the NY Department of Corrections, who were not aware of the significance of the letters until a federal task force was formed that included NYPD homicide investigators, FBI agents, and DOC investigators.

Following the 1996 trial and conviction of Luis Felipe, Antonio Fernandez, who was blessed as the Inca and Supreme Crown of New York State, knelt with other Latin Kings in front of the Federal District Court in Manhattan and was quoted as stating, "It's time for a fresh start ... Now they can't hold our past against us." From then on, the ALKQN once again began a transformation. Latin Kings and Queens began appearing en masse at political demonstrations in support of the Latino community. To further its efforts to legitimize, the organization began to hold monthly meetings (universals) at St. Mary's Episcopal Church in West Harlem. At this time, the membership of the Latin Kings is believed to have swelled to 3,000 incarcerated and 4,000 free. The monthly universals drew attendance of 500–600 regularly. Internal changes to the organization began to take place as Fernandez amended the ALKQN manifesto to include parliamentary elections and new procedures for handling inter-organizational grievances and remove death as a possible punishment, replacing it with "vanishing", the act of being banished from the movement. For the ALKQN, 1997 began with Felipe being sentenced to 250 years in prison, with the first 45 to be spent in solitary confinement. The other 39 members were sentenced to an average of 20 years in prison for their roles in the crimes. The year would bring further legal troubles as Fernandez and 31 others were arrested in a raid in the Lower East Side and charged with disorderly conduct. The Special Commissioner of Investigation for Schools soon charged the ALKQN with infiltrating the school system; a school security guard with five years of service was dismissed on charges of unprofessional conduct for his association with the Latin Kings. The year came to a close with Fernandez being arrested in December by the FBI for domestic abuse. The pending charges against Fernandez were dropped in early 1998. Following the release of Fernandez, a joint operation of the FBI, New York City Police Department (NYPD), Immigration and Naturalization Service (INS), New York State Police and the Drug Enforcement Administration (DEA) came to a close with the arrests of 92 suspected ALKQN members, half of whom the Latin Kings leadership insisted were not members. The operation, dubbed Operation Crown, cost the city over one million dollars and took 19 months to complete. Fernandez was released after four days on $350,000 bail, which was paid for by the mandatory dues that the Bloodline treasurer had collected from the community every week. Over half of the arrested were charged with misdemeanors; other were charged with weapons possession and drug trafficking. Fernandez was eventually permitted, though under house arrest, to attend monthly universal meetings. It was during his time under house arrest that the Latin Queens underwent a shake up in leadership, dismissing many of the leaders in order to bring in more politically focused members.

During this period, the Latin Kings began to gain some legitimacy within the Puerto Rican Nationalist movement, starting from when Lolita Lebrón, a member of the Puerto Rican Nationalist Party, who served 25 years in federal prison for her participation in an attack on the U.S. Capitol alongside other Puerto Rican militants in 1954, enlisted the New York State ALKQN to protect her during a demonstration in front of the United Nations headquarters. Following the U.N. demonstration, Rafael Cancel-Miranda, another Puerto Rican nacionalista who spent 25 years in federal prison for the same crimes as Lebrón, attended a monthly universal. Before the year's end, Adelfa Vera, also a Puerto Rican activist, attended a monthly universal and was given ALKQN beads by the present leadership. Vera was praised during the meeting and stated "These kids are hope for our liberation struggle. I can die in peace, because we found the continuation." In 1998, Fernandez pleaded guilty to conspiracy to sell and distribute heroin. In 1999, he was sentenced to 13 years in prison, which he began serving at Leavenworth Federal Penitentiary in Kansas, and was placed in solitary confinement. He was eventually transferred again and placed in general population, and has since been released.

Organizational structure
The Latin Kings have a hierarchical organizational structure. They have numerous "chapters" or "tribes" around the country which adhere to a regional, state, and national system. Officers are supported by a "Crown Council" of the 5 Crowns Council members. The Council sets rules and regulations and holds disciplinary hearings.

The hierarchy rises to regional officers and ultimately to two supreme regional "Incas" based in Chicago. The heads of the entire criminal organization are known as "coronas". One retired detective said in 2004: "When you compare them to other street gangs like the Bloods and the Crips, none compare to the organization of the Latin Kings."

Markings

The Latin King colors are black and gold. Gang markings consist of a five- or three-point "sacred crown", writings of LK, ALK, ALKN, ALKQN abbreviations (or the whole words), and drawings of the Lion or the King Master. Latin King symbolism is usually accompanied with the name and number of the Tribe, region, or city of the gang. The Latin Kings are members of the People Nation alliance of gangs, and are therefore opposed to the rival Folk Nation gang alliance.

Discipline
When any member believes that another member has violated a regulation, they begin the disciplinary process by submitting a Procedures for Violation Form. This form includes a variety of information about the allegation, including the violation, the statement of the accused, and members present or other witnesses. If the member is found to be guilty of the violation at their Crown hearing, they may be subject to a range of penalties depending on the severity of the offense:

Non-Corporal Punishments
 Probation – for a period ranging between two weeks and two months, can be imposed in addition to other punishments
 Fines (Multas) – may also be used as a way to recoup the expense of gang property when it is destroyed or lost by a member
 Stripping – the member is stripped of rank and titles, unlikely to ever rise to the previous rank again
 Suspension – the member is stripped of all offices and duties, is not permitted to wear the colors, and is addressed as a novice
 Community service – particular assignments made on a case-by-case basis

Corporal Punishments
 B.O.S. (Beat on sight) – beating of undetermined length of time
 Three minute physical – three-minute beating by at least three members
 Five minute physical – five-minute beating by five members
 T.O.S. (Terminate on sight) – death

"Kingism" ideology

L.A. Kaufman wrote in the February 2015 issue of New York Magazine that the Kings had a "unique mixture of intense discipline, revolutionary politics and a homemade religion called 'Kingism'". He suggests that this makes "a potent mixture for troubled ghetto kids whose lives lacked structure and hope." Kingism is a blend of tribal gang rhetoric and religious mysticism. As one member put it, the Manifesto is "considered our Bible", and reading it is to go "from the darkness to the light".

The Latin Kings operate under strict codes and guidelines that are conveyed in a lengthy constitution, and they follow the teachings of the King Manifesto. According to the Manifesto, there are three stages or cycles of Nation life that constitute Kingism:

 The Primitive Stage: "That stage in life where the King warrior acts on impulse, executing his action without giving them the serious thought that they demand. A stage of immaturity where the King warrior's time is spent gang banging, getting high, and being recognized as big and bad."
 The Conservative Stage: "At this level the King warrior becomes tired of the primitive stage. He no longer wishes to participate in the senseless routine of gang fighting, hanging on the corner or being recognized as big and bad. Most often at this level the King warrior gets married and retires. It is inappropriate to call this stage maturity stage due to the fact that the King warrior at this time does not really become mature in the sense of maturity. Instead he becomes mummified or reaches a level of accepting life as it has been taught to him by the existing system that exploits all people of color-dehumanizes them and maintains them under the economic and social yoke of slavery."
 The New King Stage: "The stage of awareness and decision. The new King recognizes that the time for revolution is at hand. Revolution of the mind! The revolution of knowledge! A revolution that will bring freedom to the enslaved, to all Third World people as we together sing and praise with joy what time it is-it is Nation time! ... For him there are no horizons between races, sexes and senseless labels. for him everything has meaning, human life is placed above materialistic values ... When a man become a new King the will of the Nation becomes his will, for to be at variance with the Nation is one thing that cannot endure. The Almighty Latin King Nation requires wholehearted and complete devotion."

According to the Manifesto, "The New King no longer views the rival warrior as the cause of his ills; instead, he fights against the Anti-King System (social injustices and inequality)".

Latin Queens
While originally the Latin Kings are thought to be a male organization, it eventually began to absorb women and give them an equal share. The Latin Queens constituted the female Queen Anubis and Queen Maat of the ALKQN.

The Latin Queen agenda is composed of self-respect, independence, family support, ethnic identity and self-empowerment. Seeking such goals has attracted a wide variety of females who had been drug addicted, victimized and/or neglected by families, spouses and partners. Sociologists studying the Latin Kings and Queens have observed the different methods in which both groups attempt to "reclaim and regulate" their environments. The Latin Queens are believed to focus more on their private space issues such as home life and protection and nurturing of their bodies, as opposed to the Latin Kings, who are more concerned with loss of public spaces in their own communities.

The evolution of the ALKQN has been viewed by outside sources as being assisted by the addition and greater role in which Queen Loki and Queen Vailor have played, exposing the ALKQN to a greater range of cross-class supporters than would have been possible prior to their integration. In countries such as Spain, Latin Queens are helping to legitimize the ALKQN through integration with government sponsored programs. In Catalonia, the 200 persons including Queen Tragedy and King Zeus and the rest of the Latin Kings and Queens tribe was designated as the Cultural Association of Latin Kings and Queens of Catalonia. The "cultural program" designation was bestowed through government sponsored programs to assist gangs with integration into society and is led by Latin Queen Melody, Erika Jaramillo.

Investigations and prosecutions

Connecticut
The Latin Kings in Connecticut started in the state's prison system in the late 1980s. The gang has over two-hundred members in the state.

Sixteen Latin Kings members, included the four highest-ranking members in the state, were arrested in Bridgeport and New Haven on June 30, 1994, and charged with conspiring to sell cocaine and heroin. Nelson Luis Millet, president and highest-ranking officer in the Connecticut Latin Kings, was sentenced to life in prison in January 1996.

An investigation by the Federal Bureau of Investigation (FBI) Northern Connecticut Violent Crimes Gang Task Force and Hartford Police Department Vice and Narcotics Division into narcotics trafficking and associated violence in Hartford's South End by the Latin Kings resulted in two gang members being convicted for drug trafficking. Hector "Bebo" Salazar was sentenced to five years and nine months' imprisonment for distributing heroin, fentanyl and crack cocaine on November 18, 2019, and Brian "Buddha" Matos was sentenced to four years and nine months' for trafficking cocaine and fentanyl on February 5, 2020.

Delaware
The Latin Kings are one of the few organized street gangs operating in the state of Delaware. Latin Kings member Alejandro Rodriguez-Ortiz was charged with the July 2, 2008 murder of Angel Rivera – a fellow Latin King who was shot dead in Wilmington – as well as the murder of rival gang member Rodrigo Monroy, who was fatally shot on September 30, 2008.

Florida
On August 20, 2006, thirty-nine leading Latin Kings members – every known leader of the gang in Florida – were arrested after law enforcement officers raided a high-level meeting at a rented club in Tampa. The raid followed a fourteen-month investigation and resulted in the gang members being charged with conspiracy to commit racketeering.

Twenty-three Latin Kings members were indicted in south Florida in May 2015 on charges including racketeering conspiracy, drug trafficking and illegal weapons possession. By January 2016, all twenty-three members of the gang – which operated in Miami-Dade, Palm Beach and Broward counties – had pleaded guilty to a variety of federal charges.

Illinois
On September 18, 1997, fourteen Latin Kings members and associates were charged with running a drug operation that distributed $6 million worth of crack and powder cocaine, marijuana and heroin throughout Chicago. Latin Kings North Side faction leader Gustavo "Gino" Colon was sentenced to life in prison as a result of the case.

Augustin Zambrano – a ranking "Corona" within the Latin Kings, making him the highest-ranking member outside of prison and responsible for overseeing the activities of factions of the gang – was among eighteen leading Latin Kings members charged with racketeering conspiracy as part of a federal indictment against the gang's hierarchy. Zambrano was convicted under the Racketeer Influenced and Corrupt Organizations Act (RICO) of racketeering conspiracy and related charges involving narcotics trafficking and violence. He was sentenced to sixty years in prison on January 11, 2012. The gang's second-in-command, Vicente "Disciple Killer" (DK) Garcia, was sentenced to forty years in prison on related charges on February 11, 2013.

Thirty-four alleged Latin Kings were charged with racketeering conspiracy in Chicago on July 26, 2016. The gang's illegal activities were uncovered during a multi-year investigation conducted under the umbrella of the Organized Crime Drug Enforcement Task Force (OCDETF).

Indiana
Twenty-one Latin Kings were imprisoned for up to thirty years for a racketeering conspiracy involving two murders; the December 2003 murder of Jonathan Zimmerman in Hammond and the May 2008 murder of Jose Cortez in East Chicago. The last of the gang members was sentenced on November 27, 2018.

Latin Kings member Darrick Vallodolid was convicted in May 2018 of conspiracy to participate in racketeering activity and conspiracy to distribute and possess with intent to distribute cocaine and marijuana. To support the conspiracy, Vallodolid murdered Victor Lusinski in Hammond on April 12, 2009. Lusinski was killed because Vallodolid thought he was a rival gang member. Vallodolid was sentenced to life in prison on November 25, 2019.

Maryland
The Bureau of Alcohol, Tobacco, Firearms and Explosives (ATF) began investigating the Latin Kings' Maryland-based Royal Lion Tribe following the firebombing of a house in Rockville on January 8, 2008. After building a RICO case against the gang, the ATF and local police arrested eighteen members during a series of coordinated raids on November 19, 2009. One other was apprehended a month later after fleeing to New York. By March 2011, all nineteen defendants had either pleaded guilty or been convicted for the roles in a racketeering conspiracy.

Massachusetts
Operation Dethrone was an investigation by the Western Massachusetts Gang Task Force, consisting of the FBI, the Chicopee Police Department, the Hampden County Sheriff's Department, the Holyoke Police Department, the Massachusetts State Police, the Springfield Police Department, and the West Springfield Police Department. The first phase of the investigation, went after the Lawrence chapter of the ALKQN, was converted to an Organized Crime Drug Enforcement Task Force/High Intensity Drug Trafficking Area case involving numerous federal, state, and local law enforcement agencies. After the significant disruption of the Lawrence chapter in February 2004, information provided by cooperating defendants led to the significant disruption of the Springfield chapter in June 2005. 57 ALKQN members have been indicted.

On December 6, 2019, more than 45 Latin King (suspected) members, including its leader Michael Cecchetelli, were arrested by the FBI and other state and local agencies, in Massachusetts.

Michigan
A multi-year joint federal and state investigation of the Holland Latin Kings (HLK) resulted in the prosecution of thirty-one of the gang's members. The investigation – which involved the ATF, Michigan State Police (MSP) the Holland Police Department – became public on July 19, 2012, when over a hundred state and federal officers simultaneously executed search warrants at over fifteen residences and a business in Holland, which were all linked to the HLK. Of the thirty-one gang members charged, twenty-nine pleaded guilty to racketeering offenses.

Minnesota
A year-long investigation by the Drug Enforcement Administration (DEA) and the Saint Paul Police Department (SPPD) known as Operation Wild Kingdom culminated in the arrests of twenty-six Latin Kings members and associates on federal narcotics and firearms trafficking charges during a series of arrests carried out across the Twin Cities area on March 7, 2006.

New Jersey
Forty-seven Latin Kings members, including eleven holding senior leadership positions, were charged between October 2002 and May 2003 in connection with a New Jersey State Police (NJSP) investigation dubbed Operation Catapult. The investigation successfully tracked and documented Latin King activity in five counties, and resulted in charges related to the planned attempted murder of a rival gang member, the sale of heroin, crack cocaine and marijuana, the theft and resale of stolen automobiles and other stolen property, and the possession, use and sale of prohibited assault weapons.

Four leaders of the Latin Kings in Newark were among fifteen people indicted on racketeering charges on July 13, 2017, as part of Operation Peddling Misery, an investigation by the NJSP and Division of Criminal Justice that targeted a drug distribution enterprise that was dealing large quantities of heroin and crack cocaine in the city. Japhet "King Japhet" Lopez, Kiele "King Forty" Lopez and Carlos "King Future" Rodriguez pleaded guilty to racketeering. On June 29, 2018, Japhet Lopez was sentenced to fifteen years' imprisonment, Kiele Lopez was sentenced to seven years', and Rodriguez was sentenced to eight years'.

New York
Twenty members and associates of the Latin Kings were charged on June 21, 1994, with various crimes including the murders of at least seven of their own members. The arrests resulted from a four-month investigation by the FBI and the New York Police Department (NYPD).

Carlos Gil, "Warlord" or enforcer, of a Latin Kings chapter in Sunset Park, Brooklyn was convicted on May 11, 2007, for the murder of Jorge Rodriguez, a member of a Flatbush, Brooklyn-based Latin Kings chapter who was shot and killed on October 14, 2001, for associating with another gang in violation of the Latin Kings' rules. Gil was sentenced to life in prison.

North Carolina
In December 2011, thirteen Latin Kings members were indicted by a federal grand jury in Greensboro for conspiring to participate in a racketeering enterprise. Nine were convicted of various crimes under the RICO act in August 2013, including Jorge Peter "King Jay" Cornell – founder of the Latin Kings in North Carolina – who was sentenced to serve twenty-eight years in prison.

Ohio
A dozen Latin Kings members were among thirty-four people indicted on drug charges following a year-long investigation – called Operation Royal Flush – by the FBI, Cleveland Division of Police (CDP) and Cuyahoga County Sheriff's Office. A series of raids coinciding with the indictments led to the arrests of twenty-nine people in Cleveland on August 13, 2009.

Pennsylvania
An eighteen-month investigation in York County, known as Operation Sunrise, resulted in the arrests of more than eighty people, including members of the Bloods, Crips and Latin Kings, and the seizure of heroin and cocaine with a street value of more than $300,000, 43 vehicles, seven guns, and more than $34,000 cash in February 2013. Fifteen Latin Kings leaders were imprisoned as a result.

Twenty three people, including three members of the Latin Kings, were indicted in March 2019 as part of an investigation into a drug ring in Berks County. In addition to narcotics offenses, the trio were also charged with conspiring to shoot a rival.

Rhode Island
An investigation by the FBI into gang activity in Rhode Island found that the Providence chapter of the Latin Kings, made up of approximately 100 members, has been active in narcotics trafficking, gunrunning, extortion and murder since at least September 1994.

Eric "King E" Thomas, leader of the Rhode Island chapter of the Latin Kings, was arrested and charged with conspiracy to distribute cocaine in December 2019. On August 11, 2020, Thomas pleaded guilty to the charges, admitting that in August 2019, he conspired with others to purchase cocaine from members of the Latin Kings in New Bedford, Massachusetts for resale. Days later, on September 4, 2019, a co-conspirator was captured in a video recording purchasing 186 grams of cocaine from members of the New Bedford chapter in a deal facilitated by Thomas.

Vermont
In January 2016, Latin Kings member Juan "Chino" Rodriguez was sentenced to serve four-to-fifteen years in prison after being convicted of carrying out a drive-by shooting that injured a man in St. Johnsbury on July 15, 2014.

John Guerrero, a member of the Latin Kings' Boston, Massachusetts chapter, was sentenced to thirteen years' imprisonment on February 14, 2020, after pleading guilty to the distributing at least 2.8 kilograms of crack cocaine in the Franklin County area and for trafficking at least thirty illegally purchased firearms from Vermont to the Boston area.

Wisconsin
Thirty-three members of the Latin Kings in Milwaukee were charged in a RICO indictment on June 19, 1998. According to the indictment, the gang members were responsible for nine murders, twenty-one attempted murders, nine robberies, three arsons or attempted arsons, five kidnappings and drug dealing over an eleven-year period. Gang-related violence escalated on Milwaukee's South Side after the indictments as a perceived lack of leadership in the Latin Kings prompted rival gangs to attempt takeovers.

Another police crackdown on the Milwaukee faction resulted in forty nine Latin Kings members being indicted on October 12, 2005, on federal racketeering charges for crimes that include four murders, 38 attempted murders and widespread drug trafficking.

Latin Kings member Timothy Vallejo was sentenced to life in prison on January 26, 2010, after being convicted of racketeering and the murder of Oak Creek resident Kevin Hirschfield outside a Cudahy gas station in 2003.

Canada
Four people were injured after Latin Kings members attacked a former member at a subway station in Toronto on 22 June 2007. A thirteen-year-old who was left partially paralyzed as a result of being stabbed.

Nine members of the Latin Kings in Toronto were arrested in October 2009 under the Immigration Act and Immigration and Refugee Protection Act after a two-year police sting known as Project Royal Flush. Four Latin Kings members, including Ecuadoran citizen Flavio Mauricio Reyes-Criollo who founded the Canadian branch of the gang in 2003, were ordered deported from Canada in July 2010.

Spain
The Latin Kings in Spain were founded in Madrid in February 2002 by Ecuadorian national Eric Javier Vara Velastegui. Branches then followed in Barcelona, Valencia and Murcia. Membership is predominantly Ecuadorian, although other Latin American and Spanish youths have also been recruited. According to a report by the Madrid government commission, there are approximately one-hundred active members and six-hundred associates in the city. In Spain, the Ñetas are the main rivals of the Latin Kings. Such Latin American gangs spread to Spain as a result of mass deportations from the United States of Latin American immigrants with criminal records. The Latin Kings were registered as a cultural association in Catalonia in September 2006.

Eric Javier Vara Velastegui received a forty-year prison sentence for rape, violent assault and kidnapping in June 2006. In February 2011, Velastegui had an additional four years added to his sentence after being convicted of directing the gang from prison, while lieutenants Jose Fabricio Icaza and Maria Torres were sentenced to three-and-a-half years' and two years' imprisonment, respectively.

The inner circle of the Latin Kings in Madrid was dismantled when fifty-four members were arrested during a police operation carried out in February 2010. A substantial amount of documentation relating to the gang and its organization, as well as gang paraphernalia such as necklaces to denote rank within the gang, black and gold flags, neckscarves and rings, was also confiscated.

Five key members were ordered deported from Madrid in February 2015.

Twenty-three members were arrested in the Barcelona metropolitan area by Mossos d'Esquadra on 10 June 2015, suspected of organized crime membership, drug trafficking, assault and extortion.

See also
 Gangs in Chicago
 Timeline of organized crime in Chicago
 My Bloody Life

References

External links
National Gang Crime Center: Latin King Gang Profile
FBI file on the Latin Kings
HBO Documentary – Latin Kings: A Street Gang Story

 
Organizations established in 1954
1954 establishments in Illinois
People Nation
Hispanic-American gangs
Latino street gangs
Transnational organized crime
Gangs in Chicago
Gangs in Connecticut
Gangs in Delaware
Gangs in Florida
Gangs in Indiana
Gangs in Maryland
Gangs in Massachusetts
Gangs in Michigan
Gangs in Minnesota
Gangs in New Jersey
Gangs in New York City
Gangs in North Carolina
Gangs in Ohio
Gangs in Pennsylvania
Gangs in Rhode Island
Gangs in Vermont
Gangs in Wisconsin
Gangs in Toronto
Gangs in Puerto Rico
Gangs in Spain
Puerto Rican culture in Chicago